Francisco Javier Winthuysen y Pineda (born El Puerto de Santa María, 1747 - Died off Cape St. Vincent, 1797) was a Spanish naval officer.

Life 
During the Anglo-Spanish War, part of the American Revolutionary War, Winthuysen fought against Britain off the coast of Galicia and off the American coast, where he lost an arm. He fought at the Great Siege of Gibraltar  and was killed in action on the San José at the Battle of Cape St. Vincent, serving as a squadron commander.

References

External links 

This article is based on a translation of an article from the Spanish Wikipedia.

1747 births
1797 deaths
Spanish military personnel of the American Revolutionary War